Ellemann is a surname. Notable people with the surname include:

Karen Ellemann (born 1969), Danish politician, former Minister for Equality and Minister for Nordic Cooperation.
Jakob Ellemann-Jensen (born 1973), Danish politician and chairman of the Venstre party
Uffe Ellemann-Jensen (born 1941), Danish politician, Foreign ministers of Denmark 1982–1993 and President of the European Liberals 1995–2000

See also 
Ellemann–Jensen doctrine, is a Danish idea specifically aimed at promoting small countries' ability to gain influence in the world order

Danish-language surnames